The Guramishvili is a station on the Akhmeteli–Varketili Line of the Tbilisi Metro. It opened on 16 November 1985.

The station was originally called TEMKA, an abbreviation for the Tbilisi Electric Locomotive Plant. In 1992 it was renamed after the 18th-century Georgian poet Davit Guramishvili.

External links
 Guramishvili station page at Tbilisi Municipal Portal

Tbilisi Metro stations
Railway stations opened in 1985
1985 establishments in Georgia (country)